Csaba Vachtler (born 16 March 1993) is a Hungarian professional footballer who plays for Tiszakécske.

Club statistics

Updated to games played as of 27 June 2020.

References

External links
MLSZ 
HLSZ 

1993 births
People from Mór
Living people
Hungarian footballers
Association football defenders
Fehérvár FC players
Puskás Akadémia FC players
Balmazújvárosi FC players
Kaposvári Rákóczi FC players
Tiszakécske FC footballers
Nemzeti Bajnokság I players
Nemzeti Bajnokság II players
Nemzeti Bajnokság III players
Sportspeople from Fejér County
21st-century Hungarian people